Zheng Shang-Chi, also known as the Master of Kung Fu and Brother Hand, is a superhero appearing in American comic books published by Marvel Comics. The character was created by writer Steve Englehart and artist Jim Starlin, debuting in Special Marvel Edition #15 (December 1973) in the Bronze Age of Comic Books, and starring in his own solo title until 1983. Described as the greatest martial artist alive, Shang-Chi has been trained since birth to be the ultimate fighter with a specialization in various unarmed and weaponry-based wushu styles, including the use of the gùn, nunchaku, and jian.  Shang-Chi later assumes leadership of the Five Weapons Society and acquires the Ten Rings weapons.

Shang-Chi was spun off from novelist Sax Rohmer's licensed property as the unknown son of fictional villain Dr. Fu Manchu. In later editions, his connection to Dr. Fu Manchu was underplayed after Marvel lost the comic book rights to the latter's character; to get around this problem, the publisher eventually renamed Shang-Chi's father Zheng Zu.

Shang-Chi made his live-action debut in the Marvel Cinematic Universe film Shang-Chi and the Legend of the Ten Rings (2021), where he is portrayed by Simu Liu.

Publication history
In the early 1970s, writer Steve Englehart and artist Jim Starlin approached DC Comics to adapt the television series Kung Fu into a comic book, as DC's parent company, Warner Communications, owned the rights to the series. DC Comics, however, was not interested in their pitch, believing the show's and the martial arts genre popularity would fade quickly. The duo then approached Marvel Comics with the idea to create a kung fu-focused original comic. Editor-in-chief Roy Thomas agreed, but only if they would include the Sax Rohmer's pulp villain Dr. Fu Manchu, as Marvel had previously acquired the comic book rights to the character, and made their protagonist half-white. Englehart and Starlin agreed. They developed Shang-Chi, a master of kung fu, who was introduced as a previously unknown son of Dr. Fu Manchu. Though an original character himself, many of Shang-Chi's supporting characters (most notably Dr. Fu Manchu, Sir Denis Nayland Smith, Dr. James Petrie and Fah Lo Suee) were Rohmer creations. Starlin left the series after #17 (replaced by Paul Gulacy) and Englehart after #19 (replaced by Doug Moench). No characters from the Kung Fu television series were officially included in the comic series, though in the #19 issue the character Lu Sun bore such a strong resemblance to Kwai Chang Caine that to avoid copyright issues, the character was given a mustache throughout the issue. With artist Paul Gulacy, Shang-Chi's visual appearance was modeled after that of Bruce Lee.

According to Englehart, his name was influenced by his study of the I-Ching, composed of 升 (shēng), meaning "ascending", and chi, meaning vital energy.

Shang-Chi first appeared in Special Marvel Edition #15 (December 1973). He appeared again in issue #16, and with issue #17 (April 1974) the publication was retitled The Hands of Shang-Chi, Master of Kung Fu. Amidst the martial arts craze in the United States in the 1970s, the book became very popular, surviving until issue #125 (June 1983), a solid run that included four Giant-Size issues and one Annual. Special Collector's Edition #1 (1975) cover-titled as "Savage Fists of Kung Fu" reprinted stories from The Deadly Hands of Kung Fu #1–2; The Deadly Hands of Kung Fu Special #1; and Special Marvel Edition #15. The character did several crossovers with other Marvel martial artists, including the White Tiger, Iron Fist and the Daughters of the Dragon (Colleen Wing and Misty Knight). He appeared regularly in The Deadly Hands of Kung Fu.

Shang-Chi had two more short series: the Master of Kung Fu: Bleeding Black one-shot issue (1990) and the MAX miniseries Master of Kung Fu: Hellfire Apocalypse (2002) with artist Paul Gulacy on art again. The character had two stories in the comics anthology series Marvel Comics Presents, including one by Moench that ran in the series' first eight issues in 1988, and co-starred in the Moon Knight Special (1992).

In 1995, Shang-Chi would be one of the revival titles produced by Milestone Media, according to writer Dwayne McDuffie, the title would show Shang-Chi using firearms, inspired by gun fu style by Hong Kong filmmaker John Woo; however, according to McDuffie, the proposal was cancelled after the departure of editor-in-chief Tom DeFalco and the death of Mark Gruenwald the following year.

In 1997 a story arc starring Shang-Chi ran in Journey into Mystery #514–516, and was intended to lead into a miniseries for the character in 1998. 

Although spun out of licensed properties, Shang-Chi is a Marvel-owned character and has been firmly established as a part of the Marvel Universe with guest appearances in numerous other titles, such as Marvel Team-Up, Marvel Two-in-One, Marvel Knights and X-Men. Most of the original licensed characters in the supporting cast have been either phased out or renamed in the more recent series and stories.

In some of his modern appearances, mention is made of his villainous father either in cryptic terms or using a variety of new names, due to Marvel no longer having the rights to Dr. Fu Manchu. In 2010's Secret Avengers #6–10, writer Ed Brubaker officially sidestepped the entire issue via a storyline where the Shadow Council resurrects a zombified version of Dr. Fu Manchu, only to discover that "Dr. Fu Manchu" was only an alias and that Shang-Chi's father's real name was Zheng Zu, an ancient Chinese sorcerer who discovered the secret to immortality. Similarly, Shang-Chi's half sister Fah Lo Suee was later renamed Zheng Bao Yu in 2013's The Fearless Defenders #8, written by Cullen Bunn, while Smith and Petrie have not appeared in any Marvel properties since the end of the Master of Kung Fu series in 1983.

Shang-Chi returned as a main character in the 2007 Heroes for Hire comic book. In 2009, the black and white one-shot Shang-Chi: Master of Kung Fu was released, with stories written by Jonathan Hickman, Mike Benson, Charlie Huston and Robin Furth and illustrated by Tomm Coker, C.P. Smith, Enrique Romero and Paul Gulacy.

In 2015, Shang-Chi starred in the Master of Kung Fu revival in the Secret Wars storyline. Written by Haden Blackman and illustrated by Taljic, the four-issue series is a wuxia-inspired story that takes place in the Battleworld domain of K'un-Lun and centered around Shang-Chi in his fight to overthrow his despotic father, Emperor Zheng Zu.

In 2017, after a 34-year gap, Shang-Chi once again starred in Master of Kung Fus 126th issue as part of the Marvel Legacy relaunch, written by mixed martial artist CM Punk and illustrated by Dalibor Talajic.

In 2020, Shang-Chi starred in a self-titled five issue miniseries written by American Born Chinese author Gene Luen Yang with art by Dike Ruan and Philip Tan. Initially set for a June 2020 release, the first issue was delayed to September due to the COVID-19 pandemic. Shang-Chi starred in a new ongoing series by Yang and Ruan in 2021, with Marcus To replacing Ruan by the 9th issue.  Following the release of the Marvel Cinematic Universe film Shang-Chi and the Legend of the Ten Rings (2021), Yang incorporated several concepts introduced in the movie into the Shang-Chi mythos, including the character Jiang Li as Shang-Chi's real mother, who was based on Shang-Chi's mother Ying Li, retconning Shang-Chi's white American mother and his mixed-race heritage; the heavenly realm Ta-Lo, which was previously introduced by writers Mark Gruenwald, Ralph Macchio and artist Keith Pollard in Thor #310 (1980); and the Ten Rings weapons.

In March 2021, the one-shot The Legend of Shang-Chi was published, by Alyssa Wong (script) and Andie Tong (art).

In September 2021, Shang-Chi starred in a miniseries made available by the Marvel Unlimited app, the miniseries was written by Alyssa Wong and illustrated by Nathan Stockman.

In July 2022, the ongoing Shang-Chi series was succeeded by a new ongoing series titled Shang-Chi and the Ten Rings, with the previously solicited Shang-Chi #13 being retitled Shang-Chi and the Ten Rings #1. 
 
Yang's 24-issue run concluded with the one-shot Shang-Chi: Master of the Ten Rings, with Michael YG replacing To on art, in January 2023. In January 2023, the graphic novel Shang-Chi and the Quest for Immortality was announced, written and ilustradted by Victoria Ying and colored by Ian Herring.

Fictional character biography
Master of Kung Fu

Shang-Chi was born in Henan Province, China, and is the son of Dr. Fu Manchu. Shang-Chi was trained from infancy in the martial arts by his father and his tutors. Believing his father was a benevolent humanitarian, Shang-Chi is sent on a mission to London to murder Dr. James Petrie, who his father claimed was a threat to peace. After assassinating Petrie, Shang-Chi encounters Dr. Fu Manchu's archenemy Sir Denis Nayland Smith, who tells Shang-Chi his father's true nature. Realizing Smith is telling the truth, Shang-Chi escapes from Dr. Fu Manchu's Manhattan headquarters, telling his father they are now enemies and vowing to put an end to his evil schemes.

Shang-Chi subsequently fights his adoptive brother Midnight, who was sent by their father to kill Shang-Chi for his defection, and then encounters Smith's aide-de-camp and MI-6 agent Black Jack Tarr, sent by Smith to apprehend Shang-Chi. After several encounters and coming to trust one another, Shang-Chi becomes an ally of Sir Denis Nayland Smith and MI-6. Together with Smith, Tarr, fellow MI-6 agents Clive Reston and Leiko Wu (his eventual love interest), and Dr. Petrie, Shang-Chi goes on many adventures and missions, usually thwarting his father's plans for world domination. Shang-Chi occasionally encounters his half-sister Fah Lo Suee, who leads her own faction of the Si-Fan but opposes her attempts to co-opt him into her own schemes to usurp their father's criminal empire.

With Smith, Tarr, Reston, Wu and Petrie, Shang-Chi forms Freelance Restorations, Ltd, an independent spy agency based in Stormhaven Castle, Scotland. After many skirmishes and battles, Shang-Chi witnesses the death of Fu Manchu. Soon after his father's death, a guilt-ridden Shang-Chi quits Freelance Restorations, severs all ties with his former allies, forsakes his life as an adventurer, and retires to a village in remote Yang-Tin, China, to live as a fisherman.

Return

Some time later, Shang-Chi returns from China and rejoins Tarr, Reston, and Wu. They battle Argus' terrorist group that aims to cause the United States to act more aggressively against all terrorists. Argus has Wu tortured, cutting off her hand. Shang-Chi and the others rescue Wu, but Shang-Chi imbibes a dose of a slow-acting poison. He is cured by Dr. Fu Manchu's elixir vitae.

A later after, the Kingpin takes control of his own faction of the Si-Fan in Hong Kong and provides them cybernetics. Shang-Chi joins forces with the X-Men and Elektra Natchios against the Kingpin's Si-Fan.

After collaborating with British Intelligence, Fah Loh Suee was eventually placed as a director of MI-6. Her endeavors perpetually placed her at odds with Shang-Chi and his fellow MI-6 agents. Years later, she once again became involved in the criminal underworld. Now going by the name the Cursed Lotus, she headed a narcotics empire supplying a highly addictive drug, Wild Tiger, with the Wild Tiger mob led by Deng Ling-Xiao, acting as a front for her in Hong Kong. Despite the Wild Tiger mob being brought down by Shang-Chi, she eludes capture.  Shang-Chi never discovers his half-sister's involvement.

Fu Manchu eventually resurfaces and employed Zaran (Zhou Man She) to retrieve a chemical from A.I.M. and later directed him to kill Shang-Chi for him. He sent his dacoits to aid Zaran against Shang-Chi and the Marvel Knights. Although they succeeded in destroying the building that Shang-Chi was in, Zaran failed to slay him. 

Later retakes control of the Si-Fan but his plot to deploy his Hellfire Weapon is thwarted once again by his son and his allies, at that time it was known as Comte de Saint Germain or Ghost. Shang-Chi have rejoined MI-6, against his father and his previously unknown half-brother Moving Shadow. The mission results in his father's Hellfire weapon being destroyed and Moving Shadow's death at Dr. Fu Manchu's hand for his failure in killing Shang-Chi.

Heroes for Hire
As a member of the restored Heroes for Hire, Shang-Chi puts his strength of character at the service of their teammates.  Humbug, turning against the heroes, tried to double-cross both his friends and the "Earth Hive" of insects, joining the Hive. Shang-Chi refuses to kill Humbug until he finds Humbug has no qualms about torturing the Tarantula if it means less suffering for Colleen. Shang-Chi snaps his neck and leaves with the catatonic Tarantula, ashamed of becoming a soulless murderer.

Still working for MI-6, Shang-Chi collaborates with Pete Wisdom of MI-13 in facing the Welsh dragon, which has become a human crime lord. He becomes the tutor of a young Earth-616 Killraven.

Heroic Age
In the "Shadowland" storyline, Shang-Chi is one of the heroes fighting the Hand's ninjas. He later works together with Spider-Man against Mister Negative and temporarily takes Mister Negative's powers until Shang-Chi is brought back to normal by Spider-Man.

In Secret Avengers, Steve Rogers tracks down Shang-Chi to help turn back the Shadow Council, which has partially resurrected Shang-Chi's father and employed the Hai-Dai, a squad of assassins, to hunt Shang-Chi down. Beast reveals to Shang-Chi and the Secret Avengers Dr. Fu Manchu is really an ancient sorcerer named Zheng Zu. When Shang-Chi and Rogers meet with John Steele and the Shadow Council for the prisoner exchange, Rogers is overpowered by Steele and Shang-Chi is captured. While Zheng Zu prepares to sacrifice Shang-Chi to complete his resurrection, the Avengers and Moon Knight drop in on him and the Shadow Council. The Prince of Orphans disrupts the ritual, resulting in Zheng Zu's death and Shang-Chi's rescue. Shang-Chi subsequently joins the Secret Avengers, but leaves the team following the defeat of Arnim Zola 4.2.3. The reveal of Zu's true identity results Fah Lo Suee's real identity, Zheng Bao Yu being revealed as well. Now in full control of the Hai-Dai, Bao Yu resumes her father's long-forgotten experiment of bio-engineering Brood eggs as weapons, which she uses to carry out hits in New York's Chinatown. The plot is uncovered by Misty Knight and Annabelle Riggs of the Fearless Defenders with help from Elsa Bloodstone; the three track Bao Yu and the Hai-Dai assassins and scientists to an underground laboratory. With the help of No-Name of the Brood, the Fearless Defenders defeat the Hai-Dai and destroy the experiments, forcing Bao Yu to teleport away from her lair.

Per the instructions of the new Madame Web, Shang-Chi is assigned to train Spider-Man in kung fu to compensate for the loss of his spider-sense, which was 'overloaded' after the wall-crawler had to transmit a strong signal on the same frequency to disable a drone army of Spider-Slayers. Under Shang-Chi's tutelage, Spider-Man develops his own martial arts style, the "Way of the Spider".

During the events of Spider-Island, Shang-Chi and other inhabitants of Manhattan are infected by the Spider-Virus, giving him the same powers and abilities as Spider-Man. Shang-Chi is also plagued by recurring nightmares of himself as a spider attacking innocent civilians. People with spider-powers run amok in the city. When he sees Iron Fist and other heroes fighting Spider-Man impostors and Peter Parker nearby, Shang-Chi protects Parker and confirms Spider-Man's identity to the other heroes. Meanwhile, the Bride of Nine Spiders attacks and abducts her teammates in the Immortal Weapons. Shang-Chi attempts to stop the Bride of Nine Spiders from abducting Iron Fist with his newly acquired powers, but is unsuccessful.

Shang-Chi learns from Silver Sable that she has found possible locations in Manhattan for the Bride of Nine Spiders' lair. Although Shang-Chi defeats the Bride of Nine Spiders and frees Iron Fist, he discovers the real culprit: the demon Ai Apaec, who seeks to feed off the Immortal Weapons. Shang-Chi fights Ai Apeac and mutates into a spider during the battle as a result of his infection, but Iron Fist uses his chi force to cure Shang-Chi. After making sure Iron Fist and the rest of the Immortal Weapons are evacuated, Shang-Chi collapses the mansion hideout on Ai Apeac, leaving him immobilized for the Avengers to put back into custody. Shang-Chi and the Immortal Weapons arrive to join the heroes during the final stand against the Spider Queen.

Marvel NOW!
During the Marvel NOW! relaunch, Shang-Chi joins the Avengers after being recruited by Captain America and Iron Man.

During the events of Infinity, Shang-Chi and the Avengers join the Galactic Council to fight against the Builders and their crusade against all life in the universe. When several allies were captured by the enemy, Shang forms a rescue team with the Black Widow, Spider-Woman and Manifold. Wielding a pair of energy projecting gauntlets, Shang's timely intervention prevented his friends from being vaporized by an Aleph. After the Builders' defeat, the Avengers return to Earth with their new Galactic Council allies to face off against an even bigger threat back home – Thanos. Shang is sent along with the Black Widow and Manifold the infiltrate the Peak and shut down Thanos' first line of defense; however, the team is intercepted by the Black Dwarf and his guards. As Manifold returned to grab reinforcements, Shang and Natasha managed to defeat the entire security force, save the general who proved to be too much for even the Master of Kung Fu. The combined might of Gladiator, Ronan the Accuser and other Council members eventually made short work of the Black Dwarf and allows Shang and the infiltration team to complete their mission.

With the threat of both the Builders and Thanos thwarted, Shang-Chi is sent to Madripoor along with the Black Widow, the Falcon, and Wolverine to stop a full-scale riot that has broken throughout out the island nation. Shang-Chi infiltrates a temple housed by the Hand but is too late to stop the Hand's new leader, the Gorgon, from completing a ritual which raises the island out of the water up upon the head of a massive dragon. When the dragon begins to take flight, Shang-Chi quickly takes out all of the present Hand ninjas at the temple and challenges the Gorgon. Despite a valiant effort, Shang-Chi is defeated by the Gorgon, who throws Shang-Chi from the edge of the dragon's head several hundred feet above the ground. Shang-Chi is rescued by the Chinese intelligence-gathering agency S.P.E.A.R and is taken to their air-bound base, the Circle, to recuperate. Shang-Chi, along with the Avengers and S.P.E.A.R.'s superhuman response team the Ascendants, go to Shanghai to defend the city from the dragon and the Hand's forces. Using Pym Particles supplied to him by S.P.E.A.R. director Xian Zheng, Shang Chi grows to the size of a giant and defeats the dragon in combat, but not before enacting payback by tearing off the Hand's temple (with a screaming Gorgon still trapped inside) from the dragon's head and throwing it several miles away.

When the Illuminati were exposed to have tampered with the mind of Captain America and attempting to destroy worlds threatening Earth as part of the Incursions as seen in the Time Runs Out storyline, Shang-Chi joined a faction of the Avengers led by Sunspot. Sunspot's Avengers, having taken control over A.I.M., discovered that "Incursion points" (points where an Incursion world that is about to hit Earth can be seen) were causing a massive number of physical mutations among those who stumbled upon the locations. Sending Shang-Chi to an Incursion point in Japan, Shang-Chi was exposed to cosmic-level radiation that transformed Shang-Chi into a mutate capable of creating duplicates of himself.

After capturing Crossbones for a mission, Shang-Chi is informed by Captain America about his former lover Leiko Wu's murder at the hands of Razor Fist while working undercover for MI-6 in one of London's triads. Shang-Chi travels to London for Leiko's funeral and while wondering around Chinatown, he is attacked by unknown assailants, one whom reveals that the crime lord the White Dragon was behind the murder. Shang-Chi is approached by triad clan leader and former enemy Skull-Crusher who offers him a truce; Chao Sima alleges he and Leiko became lovers while she was working undercover and had planned to defect from MI-6 for him. With help from Skull-Crusher and the newly arrived Daughters of the Dragon and the Sons of the Tiger, Shang-Chi confirms that Razor Fist was hired by the White Dragon to kill Leiko due to her involvement with his rival Skull-Crusher and discovers that the White Dragon has access to Mao Shan Pai, a powerful Chinese black magic. Shang-Chi and Skull-Crusher infiltrate the White Dragon's estate, where they discover a room displaying the decapitated heads of missing triad leaders. The two of them fight the White Dragon but are captured by Shang-Chi's brother, Midnight Sun, who reveals himself to be the true mastermind behind the White Dragon. With the Mao Shan Pai spellbook taken by the White Dragon's men, M'Nai plans to use its magic to give him power and influence over the triad clans, finally fulfilling Zheng Zu's legacy. Needing the heads of the clan leaders in order to complete the ritual, Midnight Sun beheads the White Dragon and Skull-Crusher and proceeds to cast the spell. Instead of giving him power, the spell resurrects Leiko from Chao's spilled blood. Since Skull-Crusher made her the leader of his clan before her death, Chao's death violated the ritual and resurrected Leiko to punish Midnight Sun. Shang-Chi is able to knock out Midnight Sun during their fight while Leiko brutally maims Razor Fist. Leiko uses her newfound powers to summon the dead spirits of Skull-Crusher, the White Dragon and the other dead triad leaders, who drag Midnight Sun into their realm. When Leiko attempts to execute Razor Fist, Shang-Chi pleads with his former lover to stop; while he is able to get Leiko to spare Razor Fist, he is unable to bring her back to her normal self. Black Jack Tarr (now director of MI-6) and his men raid the estate; Razor Fist and the White Dragon's men are arrested while Leiko escapes. Before leaving London, Shang-Chi leaves a photo of him and Leiko at her grave, which is later taken by Leiko after he leaves.

The Protectors
Shang-Chi joins several other Asian American superheroes (the Hulk (Amadeus Cho), Silk, Ms. Marvel, Jimmy Woo, and S.H.I.E.L.D. agent Jake Oh) for a fundraiser in Flushing, Queens. Later, while the group is spending the night out in Koreatown, Manhattan, they are ambushed by the alien Prince Regent Phalkan and his small army from Seknarf Seven. Shang-Chi and his allies briefly fight off the invaders before they and a large group of bystanders are teleported near Seknarf Seven, where Phalkan demands that the group offer a few people for food within a time limit. Dubbing their group "the Protectors", Woo rallies the group and bystanders into working together to escape, while Shang-Chi leads an attack with Silk and Ms. Marvel. The Protectors are eventually able to free themselves and defeat Phalkan and his forces with the help of the bystanders. The Alpha Flight Space Program arrives to rescue the Protectors and bystanders and arrest Phalkan, who Sasquatch reveals was exiled from Seknarf Seven for treason.

"Secret Empire"
During the 2017 "Secret Empire" storyline, Shang-Chi is found to have been a prisoner of HYDRA in Madripoor following HYDRA's takeover of the United States. After the Hive and the Gorgon are defeated, the Tony Stark A.I. finds him and he states that he does not have the Cosmic Cube shard anymore. A flashback revealed that Emma Frost took the Cosmic Cube shard from him when he was unconscious. Shang-Chi was later seen with the Underground when they and other American superheroes are fighting HYDRA's forces in Washington, D.C.

Domino
Seeking a way to fight her ability-stealing adversary Topaz, Domino approaches Shang-Chi (who was referred to her by his Protectors teammate Amadeus Cho) at his retreat in Lantau Island for training. After a long training session, the two spend a romantic night out in Hong Kong, only to be ambushed at a night club by a large group of Shang-Chi's enemies, led by Midnight Sun and including Razor Fist, Shen Kuei, Shockwave, Death-Hand, Shadow Stalker, Tiger-Claw and others. Domino and Shang-Chi defeat them with relative ease. The two are eventually confronted by Topaz who Domino defeats using Shang-Chi's teachings. Despite Shang-Chi's pleas for mercy, Domino kills Topaz. Disappointed, Shang-Chi breaks up with Domino and dismisses her as his student.

War of the Realms
In the 2019 "War of the Realms" storyline, after taking part in a demonstration for Jimmy Woo's Pan-Asian School for the Unusually Gifted in Mumbai, Shang-Chi and the Protectors are offered membership to Woo's Agents of Atlas. Shang-Chi and the others are suddenly alerted by the news of Malekith's invasion of Earth; most of the New Agents of Atlas head to Seoul while Ms. Marvel joins Jake Oh and the Champions in New York. Shang-Chi and the others defend Seoul from Malekith's ally Queen Sindr and her Fire Goblin forces from Muspelheim with help from the Korean heroes White Fox, Crescent, Io and Luna Snow. After Sindr threatens to summon a volcano in the middle of the city and kill millions of innocents, Brawn teleports Atlas and their new allies away from the battle, allowing Sindr to peacefully annex South Korea. Brawn eventually summons the Chinese heroes the Sword Master and Aero, Filipina heroine Wave, and the Hawaiian Goddess of Fire and Volcanoes Pele from Shanghai to help assist in the fight against Sindr. The newly summoned heroes are less than pleased for being taken out of their previous battle, but Pele quickly puts a stop to the infighting, warning the group that Sindr plans to melt the polar ice caps if they do not work together. After formulating a plan, Brawn confronts Sindr and her forces directly while Aero, Wave and Luna use Sindr's Black Bifrost to travel to the Arctic to decrease its temperature; Shang-Chi and the others are teleported to Atlas' ally the Monkey King of the Ascendants in Northern China where Shang-Chi begins training the remaining members for their final fight. As planned by Brawn, the Queen of Cinders arrives in Northern China with a captured Brawn, only to be taken by surprise by Shang-Chi and the others, who defeat Sindr with Shang-Chi's training, although Pele (who is revealed to have been M-41 Zu, a mystically enhanced Atlas android) and the Monkey King sacrifice themselves in the process. Despite given the chance to surrender, Sindr flees using the Black Bifrost, only for Shang-Chi and the others to follow her with Brawn's teleporter, where they help Captain Marvel defeat her and her remaining forces at the Great Wall of China near Beijing. Shang-Chi is later shown fighting the remaining Fire Goblins alongside Wolverine, Hawkeye, and the Warriors Three in Shanghai. After Malekith's defeat, Shang-Chi is seen with the other Agents in Shanghai looking on while the captured Fire Goblins are escorted back to Muspelheim.

New Agents of Atlas
Shortly after the "War of the Realms" storyline, Shang-Chi encounters the Sword Master in New York City, who is searching for his missing father. Noticing the upstart hero's inexperience and recklessness, Shang takes Lin Lie under his wing to improve his skills. While Shang-Chi and the Sword Master are continuing their training in Flushing, they are interrupted when white lights begin engulfing the city. The two, who are reunited with the other Atlas agents and Giant-Man discover the cities they were in (along with other Asian, Pacific and predominantly Asian cities outside of Asia) have been merged and connected together with portals. Tech mogul Mike Nguyen of the Big Nguyen Company reveals himself to be behind the newly merged city, "Pan", which he states for 24 hours would allow every citizen to easily explore each other's respective cities without any political and economic restrictions.

Sometime later, Shang-Chi and the Sword Master are confronted by Ares, who attempts to take Lin Lie's Fuxi sword. Shang-Chi makes a compromise to Ares: in exchange for Shang-Chi and the Sword Master helping him, Ares would help find Lin Lie's missing father. Ares accepts, explaining that his drakon son Ismenios had been abducted and that he wished to use the sword to kill Ismenios' kidnapper, who Ares believes to be another god. Using Pan Portals, the three are able to track Ismenios to a temple in Madripoor, where they encounter Davi Naka, the Mother Goddess of Madripoor. Naka reveals that Ismenios attempted to plunder Atlantis's treasure hoard during the absence of its sea serpent guardian, but was caught by Namor. Due to her duty to protect all dragons, Naka rescued Ismenios from Namor's wrath and imprisoned the young drakon in her temple for his protection and to placate the king. Naka further warns the group that despite her efforts, Namor is still outraged over the disappearance of his dragon and implores them to find her.

Amadeus later approaches Shang-Chi and tasks him with locating Jimmy Woo, who has not contacted the team since Pan's creation. Along with Crescent, Shang-Chi infiltrates Woo's office in the Pan-Asian School for the Unusually Gifted in the Mumbai sector of Pan, where he discovers a photograph of Woo and Nguyen together. Shang-Chi and Crescent discover a secret tunnel in Woo's office that takes them to the Atlas Foundation's headquarters in the Pan sector of San Francisco, where they confront Woo and the Atlas Foundation's dragon adviser Mr. Lao, who introduces himself to the Atlas agents. Concurrently, the other Agents find Atlantis' missing sea serpent imprisoned in Nguyen's personal tower, where her magical scales are being harvested to power Pan's portals. Woo and Lao order the team to immediately release her while Nguyen argues that doing so would disrupt Pan's portals. Before a decision can be made, Namor emerges from the waters off of Pan's coast to reclaim his stolen dragon, kickstarting a war between Pan and Atlantis.

Atlantis Attacks
In the 2020 "Atlantis Attacks" storyline, Shang-Chi and the other New Agents of Atlas are summoned by Brawn during his confrontation with Namor. Namor warns the group to return Atlantis' dragon in a day or else face the wrath of Atlantis before retreating. After the skirmish, Shang-Chi and the other New Agents are introduced to the original Agents of Atlas by Woo. When Woo sends Namora, Venus, Aero and Wave to Atlantis for a diplomatic mission, Brawn discretely orders Shang-Chi and the Sword Master to spy on Namora, due to her familial ties with Namor. The dragon is eventually released from captivity, but upon arriving home she unexpectedly goes berserk and attacks the underwater kingdom. Witnessing the destruction caused by the dragon, Shang-Chi relays to Amadeus that Atlantis' scientists discovered an implant embedded in the dragon's scales to be the source of her behavior and that Namor believes Amadeus to be behind the sabotage, prompting the king to resume his attack on Pan. When Amadeus is forcibly transformed into the Hulk and put under Nguyen's control with Sirena tech in a last ditch effort to destroy Atlantis, Shang-Chi is able to remove the device from Amadeus, freeing him from Nguyen's control and reverting him back into Brawn. After the conflict, Shang-Chi admonishes Woo for using the team as his pawns and subsequently quits.

Brothers and Sisters
Yearning for an ordinary life, Shang-Chi relocates to San Francisco's Chinatown but crosses paths with Leiko, who had rejoined MI-6. When Leiko informs him that his father's organization might be active again, they are attacked by unknown assailants but are rescued by Brother Sabre and Sister Dagger, who reveal themselves to be Shang-Chi's half-siblings. The two reveal to Shang-Chi that he has been chosen by Zheng Zu's spirit as the next Supreme Commander of the Five Weapons Society, a secret organization created by their father centuries ago, the society has used various names over the years such as Si-Fan, Golden Dawn and Hai-Dai; it is also revealed to Shang-Chi that the Honan retreat he was raised in was the House of the Deadly Hand, one of the Society's five houses, and that he was its designated champion, Brother Hand. Sabre and Dagger ask their half-brother to return to their family and reclaim his rightful place as leader of the Society from its illegitimate leader Sister Hammer, who usurped control from the previous Commander, Brother Staff, and sent Staff's Warriors to kill Shang-Chi to consolidate her rule. Realizing that Hammer is his long-lost full sister, Shi-Hua, Shang-Chi vows to save her from his father's cult.

Shang-Chi arrives at the House of the Deadly Staff in London, where he and Shi-Hua surprisingly have a tearful reunion. Shi-Hua explains to Shang-Chi the history of the Five Weapons Society and its five houses, which had gone through many names, including the Si-Fan, the Golden Dawn and Hai Dai; Shi-Hua reveals that she had been sent to the House of the Deadly Hammer in Russia as its Champion following their separation. Shang-Chi reveals the truth of their father's nature and attempts to convince Shi-Hua to leave the Society, but is rebuked. Mistakenly believing that Shang-Chi murdered Zheng Zu, Shi-Hua is outraged that their father's spirit would choose Shang-Chi over her to succeed him and reveals that she can only be legitimized as the Society's Supreme Commander by killing Shang-Chi. Shang-Chi realizes that his sister had poisoned him and begins to succumb to its effects. Instead of dying, Shang-Chi awakens in one of the House's laboratory, whose panicked scientists unleash a swarm of jiangshi to kill him. Shang-Chi is grievously wounded by a jiangshi and, before losing consciousness, he is rescued by Sabre and Dagger. While recuperating at the House of the Deadly Dagger in France, Shang-Chi is provided with a new ceremonial uniform and trains with Sabre and Dagger (who reveal their birth names to be Takeshi and Esme, respectively, to him) to prepare against Shi-Hua's jiangshi, which are powered by spirit energy and an "unavenged grievance". Shang-Chi notices that his wound has begun turning his flesh to resemble a jiangshi's, making him realize that he is slowly turning into one. A dilapidated spirit beckons Shang-Chi to the House's shrine room. Believing him to be his father, Shang-Chi uncovers a shrine dedicated to Zheng Zu's younger brother, Zheng Yi, and a mysterious map. The spirit reveals himself to be Yi and disappears before explaining anything else.

Guided by the map, Shang-Chi and his siblings are directed to Yi's tomb in Henan, where Yi's spirit appears to him in full flesh. Shang-Chi requests Yi's guidance in stopping Shi-Hua and her jiangshi and to heal his festering wound inflicted by the jiangshi. Instead, Yi's spirit tells Shang-Chi to stop running away from his family, otherwise he would lose his way like his father and that his wounds would lead to something greater. Yi also reveals that Zu did not steal his life essence for immortality, but willingly gave it when Zu tried to save him from dying.

When Shi-Hua and her jiangshi army attack London, Shang-Chi and his siblings arrive as back-up for Leiko and MI-6, providing them with paper amulets to purify the jiangshi. Shang-Chi begins to succumb to his wound and partially transforms into a jiangshi, allowing Shi-Hua to control his body to attack Takeshi and Esme. When Shang-Chi starts resisting, Shi-Hua plants a microchip containing her unavenged grievance on him to put him under her complete control. Instead of resisting, Shang-Chi calms himself, which transports the two to an astral plane where they witness memories of Shi-Hua's harsh upbringing by their father at the House of the Deadly Hand in Russia. Realizing that her anger is at Zheng Zu rather than Shang-Chi, Shi-Hua stops her assault, causing the jiangshi to collapse and Shang-Chi's wounds to heal. However, Shi-Hua blames Shang-Chi for robbing her of her life's purpose and flees before Leiko can apprehend her. On the day of the Lunar New Year, Shang-Chi is named the new Supreme Commander of the Five Weapons Society and with Takeshi and Esme at his side, Shang-Chi vows to keep the Society free of Zheng Zu's influence and to use it to protect all humankind. After the ceremony, Shang-Chi is visited by Zheng Zu's spirit, who congratulates him and comments that he is destined to become like him, unsettling Shang-Chi.

 The Equinox Blade 
While Shang-Chi is still in London, Leiko approaches him on behalf of MI-6 and asks him to steal the mystical Equinox Blade from the British Museum before it could be auctioned off due to the danger the sword poses . Leiko guides Shang-Chi via earpiece through the museum's security systems, but he encounters Lady Deathstrike, who had just stolen the blade and used its power to steal the souls of the museum's guards. After a prolonged struggle and with Leiko's help, Shang-Chi knocks Deathstrike out of a window and destroys the blade, freeing the souls it consumed to return to its victims.  For his trouble, Leiko treats Shang-Chi to gelato.

 Project Gelsemium 
Shortly after taking control of the Five Weapons Society, Shang-Chi and Leiko spend vacation together in Seoul, where they witness several gas bombs detonate across the city, turning victims into trees.  After helping White Fox rescue civilians from a gas explosion, they receive a broadcast of similar explosions happening in major cities worldwide. The three track the origin of one of the diffusors to an A.I.M. laboratory in London to, where they encounter scientist Jessa Chen, who claims she and other scientists are being forced against their will to create the bioweapon, named the Gelsemium Molecule. Leiko takes Chen to safety while Shang-Chi and White Fox fight A.I.M. guards; however Chen reveals herself as Doctor Gelsemium, the true mastermind behind the Gelsemium Molecule and uses her tree-like physiology to restrain Leiko before exposing her to a Molecule sample, taking her to a laboratory in the Pacific Northwest. With the helpf of Gelsemium's former co-workers who used to work for his father, Shang-Chi and White Fox find Leiko through her tracker and fight Gelsemium. After Gelsemium is defeated, Leiko is cured with an antidote which later supplied to Gelsemium's victims around the world.

 What Is vs. What If 
Shang-Chi encounters the Ruguo Coin and is faced with an alternate version of himself who remained faithful to his father from What If #16 (August 1979).

Enter the Phoenix
During the "Enter the Phoenix" storyline, Shang-Chi is chosen by the Phoenix Force to participate in her tournament alongside many other superheroes and supervillains to decide her next host. Along with the other champions, Shang-Chi is empowered by a spark of the Phoenix's cosmic fire and wins his first match against Hyperion, who is unable to control the Phoenix's power and immediately surrenders without fighting. For his next match, Shang-Chi is pitted against Captain America, who plans to throw the match and help train Shang-Chi into controlling the Phoenix, as he believes Shang-Chi is the ideal choice for the entity's next avatar. Before Shang-Chi can land the final blow, he vows to not use his powers to take another life, causing the Phoenix to intervene and eliminate him from the tournament, giving Captain America the win.

Shang-Chi vs. the Marvel Universe
As the new Supreme Commander of the Five Weapons Society, Shang-Chi finds himself struggling with balancing his loyalties between the superhero community and his family obligations. Sister Dagger and Brother Sabre become increasingly frustrated with the new direction Shang-Chi has for the Society while his newfound involvement with his father's criminal empire puts his superhero allies on edge. After establishing a new House of the Deadly Hand in New York City's Chinatown to serve as the Society's main headquarters, Shang-Chi is reunited with his exiled mutant half-sister Zheng Zhilan, who rejoins their family as the new Sister Staff, and his biological mother Jiang Li, who had been previously trapped in the Negative Zone for years. After Brother Sabre steals a Cosmic Cube from Captain America without Shang-Chi's knowledge to help his former lover Lady Iron Fan escape Captain America's custody, the Avengers, Spider-Man and Mister Fantastic confront Shang-Chi and the Society to reclaim the Cube. Shang-Chi realizes the truth when Brother Sabre discreetly uses the Cube's power to help Shang-Chi defeat Thor and relinquishes the Cube along with Takeshi as a prisoner to the Avengers. Despite Spider-Man and Jiang Li reassuring him, Shang-Chi's relationship with his siblings becomes strained while his former allies remain unconvinced of his conviction. Unbeknownst to Shang-Chi, these events are being orchestrated by Chieftain Xin, an old enemy of Zheng Zu, who conspires with Zhilan, Lady Iron Fan and former Society allies King Wild Man and the Red Dot Collective to bring an end to Shang-Chi's rule.

Family of Origin and Blood and Monsters
While spending time with his mother at the New House of the Deadly Hand, Jiang Li reveals her past to Shang-Chi, including her history as a Qilin Rider from the mystical dimension of Ta-Lo and how she met and married his father. Shang-Chi and Jiang Li are ambushed by Zhilan, Red Dot, King Wild Man, Lady Iron Fan and their henchmen; Jiang Li uses her psionic abilities to detect that they are being led by Xin, her father. Zhilan reveals that her betrayal is a ruse and helps Shang-Chi and the Society defeat the would-be assassins. Jiang Li explains to Shang-Chi the circumstances surrounding her disappearance and Xin's hatred towards Zu and his bloodline. Unfortunately, the assassins take Jiang Li hostage and escape though a portal created by Xin to Qilin Island. When Shang-Chi proves too difficult to defeat in combat, Xin resorts to creating several taotie from Shang-Chi's blood to hunt down anyone who possesses the bloodline of Zheng Zu. Shang-Chi rescues Takeshi and Shi-Hua when they are both attacked by taotie and the Qilin Riders, respectively, and reconciles with both of them. With all five of the Champions of the Five Weapons Society back together, Shang-Chi and his siblings take a makeshift portal to Ta-Lo to rescue his mother and stop his grandfather. The siblings are confronted by the Jade Emperor's guards for trespassing, with the Emperor himself arriving to capture them with his Ten Rings. While imprisoned in the Jade Palace dungeon, Zheng Zu's spirit visits Shang-Chi to convince him to take the Ten Rings to stop Xin from destroying their family. Xin, empowered by a taotie mask created from Shang-Chi's blood and Shi-Hua's severed hand, arrives at the dungeon to destroy the Zheng bloodline once and for all. Shang-Chi reluctantly allows his father to guide him to the Jade Emperor's vault containing the Ten Rings, donning them to save his siblings from his grandfather. When Shang-Chi tries resisting Zheng Zu's influence, Xin is able to take six of the Rings from him and defeats the Champions before heading to the House of the Deadly Hand to join the Qilin Riders in destroying the Society. Shang-Chi and his siblings are protected by the four remaining Rings, which is witnessed by the Jade Emperor, who allows Shang-Chi and the others to leave Ta-Lo to stop Xin on the condition that he returns the Ten Rings. At the House of the Deadly Hand, Shang-Chi fights Xin again but loses the remaining Ten Rings to his grandfather, who then orders the Riders to destroy New York City. With no other option, Shang-Chi gives in to Zu's influence, allowing him to reclaim all of the Rings from Xin, unlocking their full power and taking on his father's appearance and personality. Shang-Chi then uses the Rings to defeat Xin and all the Qilin Riders. Before a corrupted Shang-Chi can execute Xin, he is talked down by Jiang Li and his siblings, freeing him from Zu's influence. Shang-Chi has the Five Weapons Society repair the damage done to the city and tend to wounded civilians, revealing the Society's existence and his leadership to the public but restores his superhero allies' faith in him. Afterwards, Shang-Chi hands Xin and the Ten Rings to the Jade Emperor, who appoints Jiang Li as the new Chieftain of the Qilin Riders, forcing her to stay in Ta-Lo. Shang-Chi's siblings go their separate ways but leave on good terms with him.  One month after the ordeal, Shang-Chi discovers that the Ten Rings have left Ta-Lo and arrived at the House of the Deadly Hand.

Secrets and Fool Me Twice
Sometime before the Ten Rings return to him, Shang-Chi reunites with Jimmy Woo to take down illegal fighting rings organized by Crossfire, where unwilling participants, particularly those of color, are mentally coerced in fighting each other by Crossfire's brainwashing technology. After Crossfire and his brokers apprehended by the two with help from the Agents of Atlas, Five Weapons Society, Champions and Leiko, Shang-Chi and Jimmy reflect on their similar backgrounds and different upbringings before reconciling with each other.  Shang-Chi later discovers that the Eyes of the Dragon survived their destruction and were stolen by the Inhuman criminal Kamran. Shang-Chi, Sister Dagger and Sister Staff track down the Eyes to Jersey City, New Jersey, where they prevent Kamran from using the Eyes on Ms. Marvel to sacrifice her life to prolong that his boss, the Inhuman crimelord Lineage.

Shang-Chi and the Ten Rings
Unable to access the gateways to Ta Lo, Shang-Chi has the Ten Rings sealed in a vault within the House of the Deadly Hand. Due to the final battle between Shang-Chi and Xin being televised all over the world, the Ten Rings have become public knowledge, prompting several criminal organizations into attacking the House of the Deadly Hand to claim the Rings, forcing Shang-Chi to don them again to fight them off. Shang-Chi leaves the Rings in another vault while accompanying Leiko in rescuing Clive Reston; Shang-Chi discovers the rescue mission is a ruse orchestrated by MI6 to keep him preoccupied while the Ten Rings are stolen by Black Jack Tarr and his men.  When MI6 and MI13 accidentally summon an eldritch parasite called the Wyrm of Desolation with the Ten Rings, Shang-Chi saves them and reacquires the Rings, but not before admonishing his former friends for betraying him.  These events are witnessed by the Xian Jinzha and Muzha, who question Shang-Chi's worthiness of wielding the Ten Rings, prompting them to host a Game of Rings to find a true Ring Keeper.  

Shang-Chi and nine other fighters are summoned to the Meritorious Striving Pagoda in the Ta Lo as participants for the Game of Rings; each player is given one of the Ten Rings and forced to fight against one another in the pagoda, with the winner receiving all Ten Rings.  Shang-Chi forms an alliance with Shen Kuei and each are able to claim two Rings apiece before advancing to the pagoda's next floor.  On the next floor, Shang-Chi and Shen Kuei meet Jinzha and Muzha, who reveal the history of the Ten Rings to them.  Shang-Chi and Shen Keui are attacked by Leiko, who had been possessed by a spawn of the Desolation Wyrm and entered the tournament as a contestant.  After Shang-Chi frees her from the Wyrmspawn, Leiko apologizes to Shang-Chi for the theft of the Ten Rings and withdraws from the tournament.  However, Shen Kuei betrays Shang-Chi and steals Leiko's Ring from him as both advance to the final floor of the pagoda.  As Shang-Chi and Shen Kuei fight in the final round, Shen Kuei willingly consumes the Wrymspawn to defeat Shang-Chi.  Shang-Chi is rescued by the other remaining player, Red Cannon, who reveals herself to be Shi-Hua.  Shi-Hua destroys the Wyrmspawn but when she is prevented by Shang-Chi from killing Shen Kuei, she gives her Rings to Shang-Chi and withdraws from the tournament.  Shang-Chi pleads with Jinzha and Muzha to heal Shen Kuei; the brothers honor his request and send Shen Kuei back to his home dimension.  Shang-Chi is declared winner of the Game of Rings and is congratulated by Jiang Li and the Jade Emperor, who reveal themselves to have orchestrated the Game of Rings to test Shang-Chi's worthiness of wielding the Rings.  The Emperor warns Shang-Chi of a looming threat to Earth that can only be stopped by a worthy Ring-Keeper on Earth, which was why he entrusted the Ten Rings with Shang-Chi.

During a mission with his siblings to thwart a gang of Zheng Zu's loyalists from summoning an earlier version of their father from the past, Shang-Chi is accidentally sent back in time to the First Opium War where he encounters younger versions of Zheng Zu and Zheng Yi and that era's Deadly Warriors.  Shang-Chi is taken aback by Zu's heroic and amiable personality and bonds with him.  The two work together to apprehend a corrupt constable and part on good terms as Shang-Chi is transported back to the present.

Powers and abilities
Shang-Chi's fighting skills are so great that he has been able to beat numerous superhuman opponents. Shang-Chi is classed as an athlete but he is one of the best non-superhumans in martial arts and has dedicated much of his life to the art, being referred to by some as the greatest empty-hand fighter and practitioner of kung fu alive, with even Ares acknowledging him as one of the few mortals who can hold their own against a god without the use of magic. In addition, Shang-Chi has battled superpowered foes like Ben Grimm of the Fantastic Four in hand-to-hand combat and proved a formidable opponent. Many of his physical abilities seem to stem from his mastery of chi, which often allows him to surpass physical limitations of normal athletes. He has also demonstrated the ability to dodge and catch bullets from machine guns and sniper rifles, and is able to deflect gunshots with his bracers. Shang-Chi is also highly trained in concentration and meditation, and is an expert in various hand weapons including swords, staffs, kali sticks, nunchaku, and shuriken.

Due to his martial arts prowess, Shang-Chi is a highly sought out teacher and has mentored many characters in kung fu and hand-to-hand combat. Some of Shang-Chi's most prominent students and sparring partners have included Captain America, Spider-Man, and Wolverine.

He is also very in tune with the chi emitted by all living beings, to the point where he was able to detect the psionically masked Jean Grey by sensing her energy.

During his time with the Avengers, Shang-Chi was given special equipment by Tony Stark. This included a pair of gauntlets that allowed him to focus his chi in ways that increased his strength and a pair of repulsor-powered nunchaku. Even without such equipment, his mastery of ki enables him to challenge powerful foes like the Builders or even gamma mutates.

Originally having no superpowers, Shang-Chi has temporarily gained superpowers on several occasions. During the events of Spider-Island, he briefly gained the same powers and abilities as Spider-Man after being infected by the Spider-Virus. After mutating into a giant spider, he was cured of his infection by Iron Fist's chi, although at the cost of him losing his spider-powers. In Avengers World Shang-Chi briefly used Pym Particles to grow to immense size. Following exposure to the cosmic radiation from the Incursions, Shang-Chi was able to create an unlimited number of duplicates of himself.

Shortly after reuniting with his mother, Shang-Chi discovered that he inherited Jiang Li's psionic abilities, allowing him to form psychic bonds with his blood relatives. These bonds allow Shang-Chi to sense their location or feel any pain that is inflicted upon them. Shang-Chi's psionic abilities also extend to his dead relatives, allowing him to communicate and interact with the spirits of his deceased uncle and father.  

While adventuring in Ta-Lo, Shang-Chi acquired the heavenly Ten Rings from the Jade Emperor, granting him a variety of powers and abilities, including superhuman strength, speed, durability and stamina, as well as allowing him to fly and levitate. Shang-Chi can control the Rings telepathically which can be used in a variety of ways, including launching them as projectiles, utilizing them as platforms for transportation and generating makeshift chains to grab objects and restrain opponents. The Ten Rings can also alter their size, either shrinking down to fit Shang-Chi's wrists or enlarge themselves to ensnare a human. When Shang-Chi first wore the Ten Rings, his fear of their power corrupting him allowed Chieftain Xin to take control of the Rings away from him. However, when Shang-Chi gave in to his desire, he was able to reclaim the Ten Rings and unlock their potential, increasing his strength and abilities but giving him a similar likeness and personality of his father. Although Shang-Chi was able to completely fight off his father's influence, the Ten Rings still retained their unlocked power and loyalty to him.

Other versions
 Earth-79816 
Shang-Chi believes that his Zheng Zu is a benefactor, he is shown to be loyal to Zheng Zu and the Five Weapons Society.

Secret Wars (2015)
In the 2015 Secret Wars storyline, a version of Shang-Chi resides in the wuxia-inspired K'un-Lun region of Battleworld. In this continuity, he is the exiled son of Emperor Zheng Zu, Master of the Ten Rings, a ruthless martial arts school that uses mystical powers and techniques based on the powers of the Mandarin's ten rings from the mainstream continuity. Shang-Chi is wanted for the murder of Lord Tuan, the master of the Iron Fist school, the main rivals of the Ten Rings school. A drunk vagabond, Shang-Chi is approached by Kitten to help teach her and her group of fellow outcasts who had been exiled from each of their respective schools the techniques of the Ten Rings. Ashamed by his upbringing, Shang-Chi coldly refuses and insults the group, outraging their leader, Callisto, who informs the emperor of Shang-Chi's whereabouts. The gang's hideout raided by K'un Lun's sheriff and Tuan's student Rand-K'ai, the emperor's assassin Red Sai of the Red Hand school and Ten Rings enforcer Laughing Skull but after Laughing Skull kills outcast Cy against Rand-K'ai's orders, Shang-Chi helps the group escape with the Nightbringer technique. A guilt ridden Shang-Chi agrees to take the outcasts as his pupils, dubbing their new school The Lowest Caste. Shang-Chi returns from his exile to represent the Lowest Caste for the tournament held every thirteen years to decide which participating master would be the next ruler of K'un-Lun. Zu allows Shang-Chi to participate but alters the rules so Shang-Chi would have to defeat every representative before facing him in the Thirteen Chambers. After defeating Namor, Drew, Karnak, Lady Mandarin, Ava, Creed, Spector and T'Challa in consecutive matches, Shang-Chi encounters Rand-K'ai and Red Sai in the penultimate match of the Thirteen Chambers. During the fight, Red Sai confesses that Zu had sent her to assassinate his rival Tuan but ultimately failed. To spare his lover and her students from the emperor's wrath, Shang-Chi killed Tuan; Zu implicated and exiled his son for the murder to cover his own involvement. After the truth is revealed, Red Sai and Rand-K'ai let Shang-Chi pass so that he could defeat his father. During the fight between Shang-Chi and Zheng Zu, Zu attempts to kill his son with the Spectral Touch technique, only for the move to pass through him due to Shang-Chi learning Kitten's technique to become intangible. Shang-Chi proceeds to use nine of the Ten Ring techniques against his father and ultimately defeats him with The Gorgon's Eye''', which turns him into stone. With Zu's defeat, Shang-Chi becomes the new emperor of K'un-Lun.

House of M
In the alternate timeline of the House of M storyline, Shang-Chi never realizes his father's evil doings before his death at Magneto's hands. This causes him to become consumed with a desire for vengeance. In this reality, Shang-Chi is the head of the Dragons criminal organization, alongside Colleen Wing, the Swordsman, Mantis, Zaran the Weapons Master and Machete. The Dragons later resolved their rivalry against Luke Cage's gang, but were eventually captured in a trap created by both the Kingpin's assassins and Thunderbird's agents. The Dragons and the Wolfpack were freed by Luke Cage, in which Shang-Chi's gang join the Avengers in their battle against the Brotherhood.

Marvel Apes
In this simian version of the Marvel Universe, Shang-Chi and his father work as a subversive organization, trying to get the local sentients to work in peace and not in animalistic domination. The Avengers (Ape-vengers) murder him for this 'weak-minded' sentiment.

Marvel Zombies
In the Marvel Zombies continuity, Shang-Chi is turned into a zombie during a multi-hero effort to rescue surviving civilians. In a mid-Manhattan battle, detailed in Ultimate Fantastic Four #23, he and dozens of other zombie-heroes attempt to consume the last batch of humans. These humans are defended by that universe's Magneto and the Ultimate Fantastic Four. During a successful rescue attempt, Thing sends Shang-Chi flying through the air with one punch. Shang-Chi is then seen attacking Magneto once again, but he is cut in half by the Master of Magnetism. A different Shang-Chi appears in Marvel Zombies Return in an alternate universe where he is unaffected by the zombie outbreak. The zombie Wolverine finds him in an underground fight club, engaging with other infamous martial artists. The flesh-hungry mutant slashes him to death.

Ultimate Marvel
In the Ultimate Marvel universe, Shang-Chi first appeared in Ultimate Marvel Team-Up #15. He is the son of an international crime lord. Trained from birth to become a living weapon, he became the world's greatest martial artist and being a noble spirit, he eventually came to renounce his father's empire. Seeking to get away from his father's reach, he emigrated to New York where he worked as a floor sweeper at Wu's Fish Market in Chinatown. Feeling that the denizens of New York's Chinatown needed someone to protect them, he and his friend Danny Rand were drawn into the gang war between the Kingpin and Hammerhead after the latter targeted him to win over the Chinatown gangs to his cause. The conflict climaxed when Shang-Chi, Danny Rand, Spider-Man, the Black Cat, the Moon Knight and Elektra ambushed Hammerhead's penthouse, where a battle royale ensued. It ended with an unconscious Elektra, Hammerhead and Moon Knight. The gang members were then arrested by the police.

The martial arts warrior disguised himself as a costumed criminal in order to take down the Kingpin. The Kingpin discovered his plan and threatened to kill the hero, but he was rescued by Daredevil, who then recruited him as a part of his team to take down the Kingpin. After the Kingpin's identity is leaked to the New York Police Department, Shang-Chi and the team disbanded and went their separate ways.

Earth-13584
In A.I.M.'s pocket dimension of Earth-13584, Shang-Chi appears as a member of Spider-Man's gang.

In other media
Film

 According to Margaret Loesch, former president and CEO of Marvel Productions, in the 1980s Stan Lee considered Brandon Lee for the role of Shang-Chi and met with the actor and his mother Linda Lee to discuss a potential movie or television series starring the character. In 2001, Stephen Norrington announced his intentions to direct a Shang-Chi film entitled The Hands of Shang-Chi. By 2003, the film was in development at DreamWorks Pictures with Yuen Woo-Ping replacing Norrington as director and Bruce C. McKenna hired to write the screenplay. Ang Lee joined the project as a producer in 2004, but the film did not materialize after that point and the rights to the character reverted to Marvel. In 2006, Shang-Chi was chosen as one of the many properties in Marvel Studios' new film deal with Paramount Pictures, along with Captain America, Nick Fury, Doctor Strange, Hawkeye, Power Pack, the Black Panther and Cloak and Dagger.
 In December 2018, Marvel Studios hired David Callaham to write the screenplay for a Shang-Chi film set in the Marvel Cinematic Universe. In March 2019, Destin Daniel Cretton was hired to direct. Guntis Sics, the sound mixer on Thor: Ragnarok, revealed in an interview that filming will take place in Australia. At San Diego Comic-Con 2019, Simu Liu was announced to portray the character in the film Shang-Chi and the Legend of the Ten Rings. Originally set for a February 2021 release, the film's release date was moved to May due to the COVID-19 pandemic putting production on hold. The film was eventually released on September 3, 2021.

Video games
Shang-Chi appears as an unlockable playable character in Marvel Future Fight.
Shang-Chi appears as a card in Marvel Duel.
Shang-Chi appears as an unlockable playable character in Marvel Contest of Champions.
Shang-Chi appears as an unlockable playable character in Marvel Strike Force.
Shang-Chi appears as an unlockable playable character in Marvel Puzzle Quest.
 Shang-Chi appears as an unlockable playable character in Marvel Super War, voiced by Kaiji Tang.
Shang-Chi appears as a purchasable outfit in Fortnite Battle Royale. Books 

 Shang-Chi appears in a Little Golden Book written by Michael Chen.
 Shang-Chi and the Legend of the Ten Rings: Who Guards My Sleep by Marie Chow.World Of Reading -This is Shang-Chi. Disney Book Publishing Inc., 2021. ISBN 1-36806-997-5

 Board games 
Shang-Chi appears in Marvel United, published by CMON Limited.

Shang-Chi appears in Legendary: A Marvel Deck Building Game, as a hero in its Secret Wars Volume 2 expansion and as a "Heroes for Hire" villain in its Civil War expansion.

 Role-playing games 
Shang-Chi's appears in the role-playing game Marvel Multiverse Role-Playing Game.

 Collected editions 
 Shang-Chi: Master of Kung Fu (collects Shang-Chi: Master of Kung Fu #1–6), 144 pages, May 2003, 
 Deadly Hands of Kung Fu: Out of the Past (collects Deadly Hands of Kung Fu (vol. 2) #1–4 and The Deadly Hands of Kung Fu #1, 32–33), 160 pages, November 4, 2014, 
 Master of Kung Fu: Battleworld (collects Master of Kung Fu (vol. 2) #1–4 and Ronin #2), 112 pages, January 2016, 
 Shang-Chi: Master of Kung Fu Omnibus Vol. 1 collects Special Marvel Edition #15–16, Master of Kung Fu #17–37, Giant-Size Master of Kung Fu #1–4, Giant-Size Spider-Man #2 and material from Iron Man Annual #4, 696 pages, June 14, 2016, 
 Vol. 2 collects Master of Kung Fu #38–70 and Master of Kung Fu Annual #1, 664 pages, September 20, 2016, 
 Vol. 3 collects Master of Kung Fu #71–101 and What If? #16, 696 pages, March 14, 2017, 
 Vol. 4 collects Master of Kung Fu #102–125, Marvel Comics Presents #1–8 and Master of Kung Fu: Bleeding Black #1, 748 pages, October 17, 2017,  
 Deadly Hands of Kung Fu Omnibus Vol. 1 collects The Deadly Hands of Kung Fu #1–18, The Deadly Hands of Kung Fu Special Album Edition and The Deadliest Heroes of Kung Fu, 1,152 pages, November 15, 2016, 
 Vol. 2 collects The Deadly Hands of Kung Fu #19–33 and material from Bizarre Adventures #25, 1,000 pages, June 20, 2017 
 Epic CollectionMaster of Kung Fu Epic Collection: Weapon of the Soul collects Special Marvel Edition #15–16, Master of Kung Fu #17–28, Giant-Size Master of Kung Fu #1–4, Giant-Size Spider-Man #2 and Iron Man Annual #4	480, March 14, 2018 Master of Kung Fu Epic Collection: Fight Without Pity collects Master of Kung Fu #29–53; Master of Kung Fu Annual #1, June 26, 2019  Master of Kung Fu Epic Collection: Traitors to the Crown collects Master of Kung Fu #54–79, TBA  
 Shang-Chi: Earth's Mightiest Martial Artist collects X-Men (vol. 2)  #62-64, Heroes for Hire (vol. 1) #18-19, Shadowland: Spider-Man #1, Secret Avengers (vol. 1) #18, Avengers (vol. 5) #11 April 13, 2021 Shang-Chi by Gene Luen Yang 
Vol 1. collects Shang-Chi (vol. 1) #1–5, April 13, 2021 
Vol 2. collects Shang-Chi (vol. 2) #1-6, January 11, 2022  
Vol 3. collects Shang-Chi (vol. 2)  #7-12, Marvel's Voices: Identity (vol. 1) #1 (Shang-Chi story) August 10, 2022 Shang-Chi Marvel-Verse collects Wolverine: First Class #9, Marvel Adventures Spider-Man #2, Free Comic Book Day 2011 #1, Master of Kung Fu  #126, The Legend of Shang-Chi'' #1, June 8, 2021

Notes

References

External links 

 
Character close up – Shang-Chi at Marvel.com
 Shang-Chi, Master of Kung Fu at Don Markstein's Toonopedia. Archived from the original on February 15, 2016

 
Avengers (comics) characters
Characters created by Jim Starlin
Characters created by Steve Englehart
Chinese superheroes
Comics characters introduced in 1973
Fictional martial arts trainers
Fictional Shaolin kung fu practitioners
Marvel Comics adapted into films
Marvel Comics film characters
Marvel Comics male superheroes
Marvel Comics martial artists